Kamar Burke (born August 25, 1986) is a Canadian retired professional basketball player and the founder and head trainer of Developing Individual Peak Performance Basketball (DiPP).

College career
The small forward played college basketball at Thompson Rivers University and later, the University of British Columbia, who were among the most successful teams in the Canadian Interuniversity Sport (CIS). He was one of the top rebounders in the CIS while with the UBC Thunderbirds.

Professional career
Burke later teamed up with former on-court rival, Azi Sadi, to create DiPP Basketball.

References

External links 
 FIBA.com profile
 Kamar Burke at RealGM
 USBasket.com profile

1986 births
Living people
Canadian men's basketball players
UBC Thunderbirds basketball players
Small forwards
Moncton Miracles players